Morillo is a Spanish surname. Notable people with the surname include:

Erick Morillo (1971–2020), Colombian-American DJ
Juan Morillo (athlete) (born 1972), Venezuelan sprinter
Juan Morillo (baseball) (born 1983), Dominican Republic baseball pitcher
Pablo Morillo (1775–1837), Spanish general
Roberto García Morillo (1911–2003), Argentine composer

Spanish-language surnames